The Bank of London is a British clearing, correspondent and wholesale bank operating in the United Kingdom, the United States and Europe. The bank was founded by Anthony Watson. In 2021, Harvey Schwartz was appointed as Group Chairperson and Non-executive Director. The bank launched on 30th November 2021 and in doing so became the UK's sixth clearing bank.

History 
The executive team is composed of industry pioneers and a board of global leaders. They spent four years prior to the bank's launch creating proprietary technology which allowed them to enter the market with a $1.1 billion valuation. It became the first pre-revenue bank to achieve 'unicorn' status. The bank had raised $120 million in funding within weeks of opening for business. Its funding within its first month put it within the UK's top 10 most valuable FinTech firms. In December 2021 it was in talks with three additional investment firms to raise additional funding.

The bank is focused on shaking up the way the world's money moves. It is pursuing this goal through proprietary cloud-based core banking technology and using a Software as a service delivery model. Making domestic and global payments is cheap as a result of many fintech companies' real-time payment systems. However, it is still hard to move money efficiently on a large enterprise scale. To accomplish its goals, the bank has three target markets. Firstly, it is to take on established banks in the market for clearing and settlement. Secondly, it is to deliver global banking transactions for the corporate market. Lastly, it is to provide Software as a service to assist companies in embedding payments into their products.

In January 2022 the bank announced it was to partner its proprietary software with software by Firmly in order to enable merchants to provision secure 1-Click checkout anywhere. This software is intended to significantly reduce users abandoning items in digital shopping carts and boast sales. This partnership will help shoppers to perform a single-click checkout anywhere, instead of providing their information over and over again for the various online shopping venues they use.  

In March 2022 the bank announced it was to partner with Faster Payment System, a UK 24/7 real-time payment system. The system will enable real-time payments for millions of individuals, businesses, and charities across the UK. In 2021 the Faster Payment System processed 3.4 billion payments. The Bank of London and Pay UK (the creator of the system) are to work together to provide access and promote competition to ensure that the system reaches as many users as possible.

In June 2022 the bank announced it was to integrate SAP Fioneer Cloud for Banking platform with its API. This will provide the UK's first fully integrated real-time solution for clearance, settlement, service banks, fintech companies, and corporations. It is expected to go live in October 2022.  

Also, in June the bank announced it was to open an office in Belfast. The employees are to be housed in The Soloist Building, next to Belfast's Waterfront Hall. The bank plans to create 232 jobs by 2026. At the time of the announcement the company had 34 employees in its offices in London and New York City, with 56 job openings. Anthony Watson, founder and group CEO of The Bank of London, stated about the new office: "Belfast is now the UK's gateway city to the European Union, and this coupled with Belfast's exceptional fintech talent across multiple disciplines, makes it the logical choice for The Bank of London's Centre of Excellence to power our UK expansion." The office opened on 17 August 2022, with 50 people working in the office on the ground floor. On opening day, the Economic Minister of Northern Ireland, Gordon Lyons, visited the office. The move is a strategic expansion to capitalize on Belfast's high concentration of fintech employment. It is ranked third, after London and Singapore, as a fintech powerhouse of the future.

In August 2022 the bank announced it would be creating a technology hub in Charlotte, North Carolina. Charlotte was specifically chosen because of its strong and deep new talent pool; also, its ranking as the second-largest banking city in the US (behind New York City) gives it a vibrant banking ecosystem that attracts professionals from all across the country. Anthony Watson, CEO and Founder, further stated this about the expansion "Without doubt Charlotte has some of the best bank technology and business talent that the US – and the world – has to offer. I should know. I spent some of the happiest years of my working life in Charlotte when employed by Wachovia Bank (now Wells Fargo). I'm beyond delighted to once again work in the Queen City as we transform banking for the betterment of all." The new Charlotte positions will include software development, compliance and risk, technology operations, infrastructure engineering and business operations. The hiring will be ongoing until 2026.

See also 
 London
 100 Bishopsgate
 City of London
 Belfast
 New York City
 Charlotte, North Carolina

External Links 
 Official Website

References 

Banks based in the City of London
Online banks